Frigyes Puja (2 February 1921 – 5 July 2008) was a Hungarian politician, who served as Minister of Foreign Affairs between 1973 and 1983.

He worked as a typographer from 1934 until the end of the Second World War. Then he entered to the Hungarian Communist Party. He was the Hungarian ambassador to Sweden between 1953 and 1955. After that he represented Hungary in Norway, Denmark and Austria. Between 1959 and 1963 he served as deputy Minister of Foreign Affairs.

After that he was the party's (then already MSZMP) Central Committee's head of the Department of Foreign Affairs. In 1973 he was appointed minister. From 1983 he served as ambassador to Finland. He had many publications about the Hungarian foreign policy. In 1988 Puja published his biography.

References
 Duna TV
 HVG Online

1921 births
2008 deaths
People from Battonya
Hungarian Communist Party politicians
Members of the Hungarian Working People's Party
Members of the Hungarian Socialist Workers' Party
Foreign ministers of Hungary
Members of the National Assembly of Hungary (1975–1980)
Members of the National Assembly of Hungary (1980–1985)
Members of the National Assembly of Hungary (1985–1990)
Ambassadors of Hungary to Sweden
Ambassadors of Hungary to Finland
Ambassadors of Hungary to Denmark
Ambassadors of Hungary to Austria
Ambassadors of Hungary to Norway